The 2004 Asian Junior Men's Volleyball Championship was held in Doha, Qatar from 3 September to 10 September 2004.

Pools composition
The teams are seeded based on their final ranking at the 2002 Asian Junior Men's Volleyball Championship.

Preliminary round

Pool A

|}

|}

Pool B

|}

|}

Pool C

|}

|}

Pool D

|}

|}

Quarterfinals

Pool E

|}

|}

Pool F

|}

|}

Pool G

|}

|}

Pool H

|}

|}

Pool I

|}

|}

Classification 13th–16th

Semifinals

|}

15th place

|}

13th place

|}

Classification 9th–12th

Semifinals

|}

11th place

|}

9th place

|}

Classification 5th–8th

Semifinals

|}

7th place

|}

5th place

|}

Final round

Semifinals

|}

3rd place

|}

Final

|}

Final standing

Team Roster
Lee Jong-hwa, Chun Chang-hee, Park Chul-woo, Lim Si-hyoung, You Kwang-woo, Moon Sung-min, Hwang Dong-il, Kang Young-jun, Shin Yung-suk, Park Sung-ryul, Hong Jung-pyo, Kim Dong-kun
Head Coach: Lee Kyung-suk

Awards
MVP:  Tatsuya Fukuzawa
Best Scorer:  Hiromitsu Matsuzaki
Best Spiker:  Mohammad Soleimani
Best Blocker:  Jumah Faraj
Best Server:  Lim Si-hyung
Best Setter:  You Kwang-woo
Best Digger:  Arash Sadeghiani
Best Receiver:  Salem Mansour

External links
 Official Website

A
V
V
Asian men's volleyball championships
Asian Junior